Government Naz High School, Khairpur, formerly known as Naz High School, Khairpur is a high school located in Khairpur, Sindh, Pakistan.

History
The school was founded in 1906 as Anglo Vernacular School by Mir Ali Nawaz, a ruler of Khairpur.

In 1915, the status of the school was upgraded to high school.

In 1923, the school was renamed as Naz High school after Mir Ali Nawaz Khan Naz.

Alumni
 Pir Ilahi Bux, Chief Minister of Sindh
 Syed Ghous Ali Shah
 Syed Qaim Ali Shah
 Manzoor Wassan
 Syed Ali Aslam Jafri

References

Khairpur District
Schools in Sindh
1906 establishments in British India